is a former Japanese football player, who played for all of his career with Kataller Toyama.

Club career statistics
Updated to 2 February 2018.

References

External links

Profile at Kataller Toyama

1984 births
Living people
Kansai University alumni
Association football people from Ōita Prefecture
Japanese footballers
J2 League players
J3 League players
Japan Football League players
Kataller Toyama players
Association football midfielders